Lousame is a municipality of northwestern Spain in the province of A Coruña, in the autonomous community of Galicia. It belongs to the comarca of Noia. It has a population of 3,657 inhabitants (INE, 2011).

References

Municipalities in the Province of A Coruña